is a junior college in Sendai Miyagi Prefecture, Japan, chartered in 2009. The school has three locations: 
Itsutsubashi campus, Wakabayashi-ku, Sendai
Nagamichi campus, Taihaku-ku, Sendai
Central campus, Aoba-ku, Sendai

History 
It was chartered as a junior college in 2009. In 2013, two new academic departments were established: rehabilitation (including physical therapy and occupational therapy) and child studies.

Academic departments 
Department of Nursing
Department of Business 
Department of Child Care
Department of Rehabilitation
Physical Therapy Department
Occupational Therapy Department
Dental Hygiene Department

External links 
  

Universities and colleges in Miyagi Prefecture
Educational institutions established in 2009
Japanese junior colleges
Private universities and colleges in Japan
Buildings and structures in Sendai
2009 establishments in Japan